The 1976 United States presidential election in North Carolina took place on November 2, 1976, and was part of the 1976 United States presidential election. Voters chose 13 representatives, or electors to the Electoral College, who voted for president and vice president.

North Carolina voted decisively for the Democratic nominee, Georgia Governor Jimmy Carter, over the Republican nominee, incumbent President Gerald R. Ford of Michigan. Carter carried the state with 55.27% to Ford's 44.22%, a victory margin of 11.05%. Carter's victory was the last time a Democratic presidential candidate would win North Carolina until Barack Obama narrowly won the state in 2008. This was also the last election where North Carolina voted for a different candidate than Indiana. The wide margin of victory was likely aided by Carter being a Southerner and the governor of a neighboring state.

Carter is the last Democrat to have won over 50% of the vote in North Carolina and the last Democrat to carry Gaston County, Onslow County, Polk County, Johnston County, Iredell County, Alamance County, Rowan County, Craven County, Burke County, Caldwell County, Lincoln County, Surry County, Rutherford County, Carteret County, Stanly County, Beaufort County, Stokes County, McDowell County, Alexander County, Dare County, Macon County, Transylvania County, Cherokee County, Ashe County, Clay County, and Graham County and the last time until 2020 that New Hanover County voted Democratic. This is also the last time a Democrat swept every congressional district in the state or carried the state by a double digit margin.

Primary Elections

Democratic primary
Former Georgia Gov. Jimmy Carter scored a decisive victory over Alabama Gov. George Wallace in the North Carolina Democratic presidential primary on March 23, 1976, with approximately 53% of the vote to Wallace's 35%. Sen. Scoop Jackson trailed far behind, with approximately 4%. The North Carolina primary was the first in which Carter won an absolute majority and helped seal his ultimate nomination. Wallace, who had won the North Carolina primary in 1972, was all but eliminated from the race by his defeat.

Republican primary
Former California Gov. Ronald Reagan defeated incumbent President Ford in the North Carolina Republican presidential primary on March 23, 1976, with approximately 52% of the vote. It was Reagan's first primary victory of 1976, and came about with key support from North Carolina Senator Jesse Helms. Reagan's win prolonged the contest for the Republican nomination and paved the way for him to be elected president in 1980. Reagan would go on to narrowly win the state in 1980.

Results

Results by county

References

North Carolina
1976
1976 North Carolina elections